Richard Kastle (born December 15, 1958) is an American classical pianist and composer.

Life and career
Kastle was born in Palm Beach, Florida, and began playing piano at age eight in 1966, learning to play by ear. "He's a musical genius." said his former piano teacher. "I remember he walked In and played the Hungarian Rhapsody No. 2 by Franz Liszt after hearing it on the Tom and Jerry cartoon," she said. "Back then, he couldn't even read music." Kastle studied with Ivan Davis. He began composing piano concertos as a teenager while studying with Davis. He continued his studies as a piano major at the University of North Texas, where he was expelled for calling in sick on his final recital. An official at the music department recalled Kastle, but said that neither he nor anyone else could remember enough about the case to comment. Kastle said that it was his refusal to dress formally for concerts that ultimately got him expelled from the music department. He later made monthly performances at clubs in Venice and Santa Monica, California where he built a following of young, often college-age, listeners.

Performance and recording career
Kastle made his network television debut in 1989 on CBS's The Pat Sajak Show, after an appearance on Canadian teen show Pilot One. He signed with Virgin Records in 1991 and released the album Streetwise in the same year. Kastle's television appearances include a performance and interview on The Joan Rivers Show and NBC's The Tonight Show with Jay Leno. Kastle promoted his national tour on the episode that aired July 3, 1991. The tour included solo concerts and appearances with comedians George Carlin and Jay Leno. In 1992, he recorded his Piano Concerto No. 5, also known as the Royce Concerto,
with the Philharmonia Orchestra in London. He appeared at Lincoln Center on November 8, 1996, performing his own compositions and works by Chopin and Liszt. Titanic Symphony is his third symphony and is based on the sinking of the RMS Titanic. He conducted the premieres of his Titanic Symphony and Symphony No. 5 at Lincoln Center on November 6, 1999. Kastle has composed eight piano concertos. In 2003, he played arrangements of Beethoven's sonatas for piano and orchestra and premiered his Piano Concerto No. 8. He performs piano recitals on college campuses. A print biography about Kastle was published by Dic Press in 2012.

Awards
In 1976, the mayor of Hialeah proclaimed March 30 in honor of Kastle. At the time, he was a student at Hialeah Miami-Lakes High School who had just competed successfully for a music scholarship.

Albums
Streetwise
Royce Concerto

References

External links

American classical pianists
Male classical pianists
American male pianists
American male classical composers
American classical composers
20th-century classical composers
Virgin Records artists
University of North Texas College of Music alumni
1958 births
Living people
20th-century American composers
20th-century American pianists
21st-century classical pianists
20th-century American male musicians
21st-century American male musicians
21st-century American pianists